Doing It to Death is an album by The J.B.'s, released in 1973  by People Records. The album includes a ten-minute version of the #1 R&B hit "Doing It to Death", which is led by Danny Ray's introduction to simulate his MC in concerts.

The introduction, like many Brown's produced live albums, such as Live at the Apollo, Live at Apollo, Volume II and Revolution of the Mind were sampled on hip hop and electronic music.

Track listing 
All songs were written and arranged by James Brown
"Introduction to the J.B.'s" – 0:24
"Doing It to Death Parts 1 & 2" – 10:01
"You Can Have Watergate Just Gimme Some Bucks and I'll Be Straight" – 0:14
"More Peas" – 8:27
"La Di Da La Di Day" (from the Motion Picture Slaughter's Big Rip-Off) – 5:39
"You Can Have Watergate Just Gimme Some Bucks and I'll Be Straight" – 0:14
"Sucker" – 8:10
"You Can Have Watergate Just Gimme Some Bucks and I'll Be Straight" – 6:28

Personnel 
James Brown – lead vocal, organ, arrangements
Fred Wesley – trombone
Darryl "Hasaan" Jamison – trumpet
Jerone "Jasaan" Sanford - trumpet
Ike Oakley – trumpet
Maceo Parker – alto saxophone
St. Clair Pinckney – tenor saxophone
Eldee Williams – tenor saxophone
Hearlon "Cheese" Martin – guitar
Jimmy Nolen – guitar
Fred Thomas – bass
John "Jabo" Starks – drums
Technical
Bob Both - mixing at Advantage Studios, New York City

References 

Bowman, Rob. "[ Doing It to Death]". Allmusic.

The J.B.'s albums
James Brown albums
1973 albums
Albums produced by James Brown